The 2010 FIA GT1 Nürburgring round was an auto racing event held at the Nürburgring Grand Prix circuit, Nürburg, Germany on 27–29 August 2010.  It served as the sixth round of the 2010 FIA GT1 World Championship season, and was supported by several series including the GT4 European Cup, ADAC GT Masters, and ATS Formel 3 Cup.

Darren Turner and Tomáš Enge of Young Driver Aston Martin swept the weekend, earning pole position in qualifying and winning both the Qualifying Race and Championship Race.

Qualifying
Teammates Darren Turner and Tomáš Enge each led one of the three qualifying sessions as the No. 7 Young Driver AMR Aston Martin earned pole position in the final session by over 0.4 seconds ahead of the No. 24 Reiter Lamborghini.  Championship leaders Michael Bartels and Andrea Bertolini of the Vitaphone Racing Team qualified fifth.

Qualifying result
For qualifying, Driver 1 participates in the first and third sessions while Driver 2 participates in only the second session.  The fastest lap for each session is indicated with bold.  Note that four cars were penalised for using excessive sections of runoff outside the circuit during qualifying.  Stewards demoted the No. 3 Swiss Racing, No. 8 Young Driver, No. 34 Hegersport, and No. 38 Münnich entries three grid positions.

Races

Qualifying Race

Race result

Championship Race

Race result

References

External links

 Nürburgring GT1 Race in France – FIA GT1 World Championship

Nurburgring
FIA GT1
Sport in Rhineland-Palatinate